Discospermum is a genus of flowering plants in the family Rubiaceae. The genus is found from India to the Philippines.

Species 

 Discospermum abnorme (Korth.) S.J.Ali & Robbr.
 Discospermum apiocarpum Dalzell ex Hook.f.
 Discospermum beccarianum (King & Gamble) S.J.Ali & Robbr.
 Discospermum coffeoides  (Pierre ex Pit.) Arriola & A.P.Davis
 Discospermum javanicum (Miq.) Kuntze
 Discospermum malaccense (Hook.f.) Kuntze
 Discospermum parvifolium Kuntze
 Discospermum philippinensis Arriola & Alejandro
 Discospermum polyspermum (Valeton) Ruhsam
 Discospermum quocensis (Pierre ex Pit.) Arriola & A.P.Davis
 Discospermum reyesii Arriola, Valdez & Alejandro
 Discospermum sphaerocarpum Dalzell ex Hook.f.
 Discospermum whitfordii (Elmer) S.J.Ali & Robbr.

References

Rubiaceae genera
Coffeeae
Taxa named by Nicol Alexander Dalzell